George Jacob Tweedy (8 January 1913 – 23 April 1987) was an English footballer who played goalkeeper and earned one cap for England. He was a one club player for Grimsby Town.

He went on to play 347 league games in a World War II interrupted career spanning 20 years. He is considered to be Grimsby's "best ever goalkeeper".

Grimsby Town
Born in the rural mining town of Willington, County Durham, Tweedy first played for Durham Schools and then his hometown club Willington F. C. He made his debut for Grimsby against Bradford City on 19 November 1932 upon replacement of Read, the regular goalkeeper, who had a broken finger. At the time of his debut, Grimsby had just been relegated from the First Division, they rejoined the top division in Tweedy's second season with the club by winning the Second Division championship. This led to six consecutive seasons in the top division, two FA Cup semi finals, the club's highest ever league ranking as fifth and Tweedy winning his only England cap.  He went on to miss the second FA Cup semi-final to an injury and was replaced by Moulson, who also injured himself during that semi-final match.

World War hiatus
During the Second World War, players played in teams close to where they were stationed and this gave Tweedy the chance to play with Grimsby Town until 1942. However, most of the team including keeper Tweedy were eventually sent off to battle and this left the remaining team with a mixture of untried young players and guests. Tweedy's replacement in goal was, once again, George Moulson who left for Lincoln County upon Tweedy's return in 1946. Tweedy played as a guest for both Arsenal and Hibernian in the intervening years. After World War 2, Grimsby managed only two more seasons in the First Division and have never regained such a status since. Keeper Tweedy is also the second of three Grimsby players to be capped by England whilst playing for the club.

He retired as a player in 1950 to become assistant manager with Grimsby, and from July 1950 to January 1951, stayed with the team as caretaker manager. He returned as a player for a small time period in late 1951, before finally retiring on 3 April 1953.

England
George played his only game for England on 2 December 1936 at Highbury against Hungary. England won 6–2 in front of a crowd of around 36,000 people. He was prevented from acquiring more caps by being in competition with fellow goalkeepers Woodley (19 caps) of Chelsea and Hibbs (25 caps) of Birmingham.

Honours
Grimsby Town
Second Division Champions: 1934
Third Division North Runners Up: 1952

References

External links
George Tweedy at EnglandStats.com
George Tweedy at EnglandFanzine.co.uk

1913 births
1987 deaths
Grimsby Town F.C. players
Grimsby Town F.C. managers
English footballers
England international footballers
Association football goalkeepers
Arsenal F.C. wartime guest players
Hibernian F.C. wartime guest players
Willington A.F.C. players
English football managers
People from Willington, County Durham
Footballers from County Durham